Group D of the 2002 FIFA World Cup took place on 14 June 2002. South Korea won the group, and advanced to the second round, along with the United States. Portugal and Poland failed to advance.

Standings

South Korea advanced to play Italy (runner-up of Group G) in the round of 16.
United States advanced to play Mexico (winner of Group G) in the round of 16.

Matches
All times local (UTC+9)

South Korea vs Poland

United States vs Portugal

South Korea vs United States

Portugal vs Poland

Portugal vs South Korea

Poland vs United States

External links
 Results

D
United States at the 2002 FIFA World Cup
South Korea at the 2002 FIFA World Cup
Poland at the 2002 FIFA World Cup
Portugal at the 2002 FIFA World Cup